Algernon Turnor  (14 November 1845 – 11 December 1921), CB, was a British civil servant who was financial secretary to the British General Post Office.

Turnor married Lady Henrietta Caroline, daughter of Randolph (Stewart) 9th Earl of Galloway, on 3 August 1880.

Correspondence between Turnor and Lord Beaconsfield is held is the special collections of the Bodleian Library at Oxford University. A significant amount of material relating to Turnor's position at the Post Office is held by the British Postal Museum & Archive.

References

1845 births
1921 deaths
Alumni of Christ Church, Oxford
British civil servants
Companions of the Order of the Bath
English justices of the peace
People educated at Eton College